Greilada is a genus of sea slugs, dorid nudibranchs, shell-less marine gastropod molluscs in the family Polyceridae.

Species 
Species in the genus Greilada include:
Greilada elegans Bergh, 1894

References

Polyceridae